Sick Kids need Involved People (SKIP) of New York, Inc.  is a 501(c)(3) not-for profit agency for families who want to care for their chronically ill, medically fragile, or developmentally disabled children. SKIP is an advocacy and service agency that helps families who have seriously ill children access the necessary resources and support to enable them to live at home with their families. SKIP helps set in place the health insurance and services required for these children and serves as collaborative and innovative stewards to these families and children as they navigate the health care system. It insures that families remain equal partners with professionals in determining their children's needs.

References 
When the Prescription is Home Care Time Magazine, June 4, 2007. 
Child Magazine's Children's Champion Awards: Local Hero: Margaret Mikol Child Magazine, November, 2003.
Knoll, James A.   Come Together: The Experience of Families of Children with Severe Disabilities or Chronic Illness Human Services Research Institute, Cambridge, MA. September, 1989.
 Stillerman, Elaine Margaret Mikol and SKIP Real Savvy Moms 
United Hospital Fund Provides $502,000 in Grants to Improve City's Health Services United Hospital Fund, November 22, 2005. 
Cummings, Betsy Home Front; Illness Strikes, and Insurance Falls Short The New York Times, May 2, 2004.

External links 
SKIP of New York (official website)
The Children's Advocacy Project of New York City
Developmental Disabilities Alliance of Western New York

Non-profit organizations based in New York (state)
Organizations established in 1983